Susan Christine O'Meara Getzendanner (born 1939) is a former United States district judge of the United States District Court for the Northern District of Illinois, and in 2013 was listed as a NAFTA adjudicator.

Education and career

Getzendanner was born in Chicago, Illinois. She received a Bachelor of Business Administration from Loyola University Chicago in 1966 and a Juris Doctor from Loyola University Chicago School of Law in 1966. She was a law clerk for Judge Julius Hoffman of the United States District Court for the Northern District of Illinois from 1966 to 1968. Thereafter, she entered private practice in Chicago.

Federal judicial service

Getzendanner was nominated by President Jimmy Carter on June 4, 1980, to a new seat on the United States District Court for the Northern District of Illinois created by 92 Stat. 1629. She was confirmed on September 29, 1980, and received her commission on September 30, 1980. On September 30, 1987, she resigned and re-entered private practice.

Notable case

She was the presiding judge in the second trial of Wilk v. American Medical Association (May/June 1987).

References

Sources
 

1939 births
Living people
Judges of the United States District Court for the Northern District of Illinois
United States district court judges appointed by Jimmy Carter
20th-century American judges
Loyola University Chicago School of Law alumni
20th-century American women judges